Taylor Kathleen "Tay" Jardine (born March 7, 1990) is an American singer and songwriter. She is best known as the lead vocalist of the pop punk band We Are the In Crowd. Following the band announcing a hiatus in February 2016, Jardine began working on a new project, SAINTE, along with two other members of We Are The In Crowd - Mike Ferri and Cameron Hurley.

Early life 
Jardine was born to Ray and Robyn Jardine in Liberty, New York. Jardine is a triplet. She has a brother, Devin, and two sisters, Lindsey and Samantha. When she was young, her parents  divorced and her father moved to Florida. Her father died when she was 13 and inspired her to make music. In high school, Jardine played violin and was the lead vocalist in a band called Sofmoure.

We Are the In Crowd 
In 2009, Jardine joined studio project, The In Crowd. The other members of the project were Jordan Eckes (vocals and guitar), Mike Ferri (bass), and Rob Chianelli (drums). The band released a digital sampler through Myspace and quickly gained a fanbase. Later that year, the band's Myspace was hacked by a former member. Jardine released a video on YouTube explaining the hacking to their fans, which garnered the attention of Hopeless Records. Shortly after, they were signed. After signing to the label, the band picked up Cameron Hurley (lead guitarist and backing vocals). The band changed their name after copyright problems with the Jamaican reggae band with the same name. Instead of changing their name completely, they added "We Are" to the original name. We Are The In Crowd has released an EP, Guaranteed to Disagree (2010), and two albums, Best Intentions (2011) and Weird Kids (2014).

SAINTE 
In February 2016, Jardine announced a new, unnamed musical project. The project will include We Are The In Crowd members Mike Ferri and Cameron Hurley. Jardine revealed that the project will be more "poppy" than We Are The In Crowd, and revealed in late September that the project would be called SAINTE. They released their debut single "Technicolor", with an accompanying music video; "With or Without Me" and "Eyes Are Open" followed as later singles. SAINTE announced on June 26, 2017, that their debut EP is called Smile, And Wave. It was released June 30, 2017.

Singles 
 "Technicolor" (2016)
 "With Or Without Me" (2017)
 "Eyes Are Open" (2017)
 "Back 2 Me" (2019)
 "Everything Makes Me Sad" (2019)
 "Tough To Love" (2019)

EP 
 Smile, And Wave (2017)
 bad summer (2019)

Personal life 
Jardine resides in New York with her dog Willow. In 2014, she partnered with Never Take It Off to start her own jewelry line. She also does frequent modeling for the clothing line Glamour Kills and has a signature bomber jacket there.

References

External links 
 http://www.rocksound.tv/news/article/the-incredible-story-of-tay-jardine-only-in-the-new-rock-sound
 http://www.mtv.com/artists/we-are-the-in-crowd/biography/
 

1990 births
Living people
21st-century American singers